A grand jury is a group of citizens empowered by law to determine whether criminal charges should be brought on an accused.

Grand Jury may also refer to:

Grand Jury (film), a 1936 film
Grand Jury (TV series)

See also
Jury (disambiguation)